Carlos Garfias Merlos (born 1 January 1951) is a Mexican prelate of the Catholic Church who has been Archbishop of Morelia since 2016.

Biography
Carlos Garfias Merlos was born in Tuxpan, Michoacán, on 1 January 1951.

He studied humanities, philosophy and theology at the Seminary of Morelia. He earned a masters and a doctorate in psychotherapy and spirituality at the la Universidad Intercontinental in Mexico City. 

On 23 November 1975, he was ordained a priest for the Archdiocese of Morelia.

On 24 June 1996, Pope John Paul II named him Bishop of Ciudad Altamirado and he received his episcopal consecration on 25 July from Apostolic Nuncio Girolamo Prigione and Archbishops Rafael Bello Ruiz and Alberto Suárez Inda.

Within the Episcopal Conference of Mexico (ECM), he was President of the Episcopal Commission for Youth Pastoral Care from 1997 to 2000 and a member of its Family Pastoral Commission and spokesperson for the Southern Region.

On 8 July 2003, Pope John Paul II transferred him to the Diocese of Netzahualcóyotl
and he was installed there on 22 August.

From 2004 to 2006 he was a member of the ECM Commissions on Clergy and on Family Pastoral Care. From 2007 to 2009 he was charged with responsibility for the aspect of labor on its Commission for Societal Pastoral Care.

On 7 June 2010, Pope Benedict XVI appointed him Archbishop of Acapulco. He received the pallium from Benedict in Rome on 29 June and was installed in Acapulco on 22 July.

From 2016 to 2018 he served on the President's Council of the ECM.

On 5 November 2016, Pope Francis named him Archbishop of Morelia. He was installed on 18 January 2017 and received his pallium from Francis on 29 June. In November 2018, he was elected Vice-President of the ECM.

References 

Additional sources

External links

 

1951 births
Living people
21st-century Roman Catholic archbishops in Mexico
People from Michoacán
Roman Catholic archbishops of Morelia